California Junction is an unincorporated community and census-designated place (CDP) in Harrison County, Iowa, United States.  It lies just east of the junction between the east-west and north-south lines of the former Sioux City and Pacific Railroad. In the 2010 census it had a population of 85 inhabitants and a population density of 184.38 people per square mile (71.19/km).

Geography
California Junction is located near the southwest corner of Harrison County at coordinates . U.S. Route 30 passes just south of California Junction, leading east  to Interstate 29 on the outskirts of Missouri Valley and west  to Blair, Nebraska.

According to the United States Census Bureau, California Junction has a total area of 0.461 square miles (1.19 km), all of it land.

Demographics

As of the 2010 census, there were 85 people, 32 households, and 26 families residing in the town. The racial makeup of the town was 98.82% White and 1.18% from two or more races. Of the total population, 4.7% were Hispanic or Latino of any race.

History
The town of California Junction traces its origins to the Yazoo post office and the ill-fated towns of Cincinnati and Parrish City, which were founded in Cincinnati township during the later half of the 1850s.  Yazoo Landing was a ferry crossing on the Missouri River where the Blair Bridge now stands.  The present settlement was established in 1880, after the Sioux City and Pacific Railroad was built.  John I. Blair, the railroad tycoon, believed that this would be an important hub for passengers heading west, and gave the town its current name.  In 1883, the name of the town was changed to "California" to avoid confusion with Columbia Junction; it retained this name as of 1915.

In 1879, California Junction had a population of 200 people; the population was 76 in 1902. In 1903, the California Grain and Lumber Company was organized in California Junction.  By 1915, there was also a town hall, high school, general store, blacksmith shop, post office, two churches, and a train station.

On January 1, 1922, a 1460-foot deep well was drilled at the nearby oil prospect of Hugh R. Coulthard, a prominent landowner, businessman, and farmer from California Junction.  No oil was obtained from the site, but the capped well leaks water to this day.  A marshy area surrounding the well remains as a local landmark, which is visible about 160 yards north of town on Fremont Ave., about 30 yards west of the roadway.

In 1925, California Junction's population was 84.

A grain elevator is still operated at California Junction by the United Western Coop.

Education
The community of California Junction and the surrounding rural area educational needs are met by the Missouri Valley Community School District.

Notable people 

 James F. O'Connor (1878–1945) U.S. Representative of Montana

References

External links

Facebook Community Page for California Junction, Iowa

Census-designated places in Iowa
Census-designated places in Harrison County, Iowa